George Oliver Youren (19 November 1891 – 7 April 1967) was an Australian rules footballer who played with Collingwood in the Victorian Football League (VFL).  His son Colin Youren played for Hawthorn from the 1950s.

Sources

External links
 
 George Youren's playing statistics from The VFA Project

1891 births
Australian rules footballers from Melbourne
Collingwood Football Club players
Northcote Football Club players
1967 deaths
People from Clifton Hill, Victoria